Pizzetti may refer to:

People
Paolo Pizzetti (1860—1918), Italian geodesist, astronomer, geophysicist and mathematician
Ildebrando Pizzetti (1880–1968), Italian composer
Angelo Pizzetti (born 1963), Italian football player
Samuel Pizzetti (born 1986), Italian swimmer

Other
Pizzetti (crater), a Moon crater named after Paolo Pizzetti
A Greek snack